In the 1944–45 season, USM Blida is competing in the First Division for the 12th season French colonial era. They will be competing in First Division, and the Forconi Cup.

Friendly

Competitions

Overview

League table

First Division

Matches

Playoff

Forconi Cup

Players statistics

|-
! colspan=12 style=background:#dcdcdc; text-align:center| Goalkeepers

|-
! colspan=12 style=background:#dcdcdc; text-align:center| Defenders

|-
! colspan=12 style=background:#dcdcdc; text-align:center| Midfielders

|-
! colspan=12 style=background:#dcdcdc; text-align:center| Forwards

|}

References

External links
La Presse libre (Alger)
L'Indépendant
L'Echo d'Alger
Le Tell

USM Blida seasons
Algerian football clubs 1944–45 season